Dichapetalaceae is a family of flowering plants, consisting of 3 genera and about 170 species. Members of this family are trees, shrubs or lianas found in tropical and subtropical regions of the world.

The species Dichapetalum cymosum of Southern Africa is highly poisonous because of fluoroacetate.

References

 
Malpighiales families
Taxa named by Henri Ernest Baillon